Lee Johnson may refer to:

Sportspeople
Lee Johnson (punter) (born 1961), American football punter
Lee Johnson (basketball) (born 1957), American basketball player
Lee Johnson (lineman), arena football player and coach
Lee Johnson (football coach) (born 1980), English football coach
Lee Johnson (footballer) (born 1981), English footballer and manager
Lee Johnson (wrestler), American professional wrestler signed to All Elite Wrestling

Others
Lee Johnson (Oregon judge), American politician
Lee A. Johnson (born 1947), American Kansas Supreme Court Justice
Lee Johnson (art historian) (1924–2006)

See also
Lee Johnston (born 1972), British bobsledder